The Hope and Anchor Tavern (formerly Hope and Anchor Hotel, the Alexandra, the Whale Fishery and the Hope) is an Australian pub in Hobart, Tasmania.  Built in 1807, it is the oldest continually licensed pub in Australia.   However, The Bush Inn in New Norfolk claims to be the oldest operating Australian pub, because their venue has operated continuously since it opened in 1815 whereas the Hope and Anchor Tavern has had periods of closure (whilst still holding their licence) since opening in 1807. The Hope and Anchor Tavern is referred to in 'Captain A E Sykes: memoirs'

It was reopened in 2014 after the building and its extensive antique collection were purchased by Chinese developer Kim Xing for A$1.5 million. The property was then leased to Robert Wilson and licensed to Daniel Cullen.  whose goal was to preserve a piece of Tasmanian history. The building has been listed on the Tasmanian Heritage Register since 1998. The Hope and Anchor Tavern was owned for many years by Gunter Jaeger, who also owns Boomer Island.
In 2015, the owner and licensee was Daniel Cullen.

See also

List of oldest companies in Australia

References

Hotels in Hobart
Pubs in Tasmania
1815 establishments in Australia
Australian companies established in 1815
Commercial buildings completed in 1815
Tasmanian Heritage Register